The seventh season of Frasier originally aired from September 23, 1999, to May 18, 2000, on NBC.

Cast

Main
 Kelsey Grammer as Frasier Crane
 Jane Leeves as Daphne Moon
 David Hyde Pierce as Niles Crane
 Peri Gilpin as Roz Doyle
 John Mahoney as Martin Crane

Special guest
Saul Rubinek as Donny Douglas
Rita Wilson as Mia
Katie Finneran as Poppy
Dan Butler as Bulldog
Jane Adams as Mel
Bebe Neuwirth as Lilith
Jean Smart as Lana
Marg Helgenberger as Emily
Brian Bedford as Edward
Harriet Sansom Harris as Bebe Glazer
Robert Loggia as Stefano
S. Epatha Merkerson as Dr. McCaskill
Anthony LaPaglia as Simon

Recurring
Edward Hibbert as Gil Chesterton
Patrick Kerr as Noel
Tom McGowan as Kenny

Guest
Gigi Rice as Regan
Trevor Einhorn as Frederick
Anthony Zerbe as Clifford
Anthony Heald as Corkmaster
Kim Coles as Dr. Mary
Millicent Martin as Mrs. Moon

Episodes

Reception

Accolades 

The series was nominated for three Creative Arts Emmy Awards and six Primetime Emmy Awards, winning two. Frasier received four nominations at the 58th Golden Globe Awards and Grammer won Best Actor in a Television Series Musical or Comedy. The cast won Outstanding Performance by an Ensemble in a Comedy Series at the 6th Screen Actors Guild Awards. Writers Christopher Lloyd and Joe Keenan won a Writers Guild of America Award for "Something Borrowed, Someone Blue", while Keenan also received a nomination for "Out with Dad". Ron Volk earned a nomination from the American Cinema Editors for his work on "Dark Side Of The Moon". While Pamela Fryman was nominated for Outstanding Directing in a Comedy Series at the Directors Guild of America Awards for "The Fight Before Christmas".

Casting director Jeff Greenberg received a nomination at the 16th Artios Awards. Frasier gathered ten nominations from the Online Film & Television Association. The show was nominated for three accolades at the second annual TV Guide Awards, including Favorite Comedy Series and Favorite TV Pet. It also garnered six nominations at the Viewers for Quality Television Awards.

References 

1999 American television seasons
2000 American television seasons
Frasier 07